"I Tell It Like It Used to Be" is a song written by Ron Hellard, Michael Garvin and Bucky Jones, and recorded by American country music artist T. Graham Brown.  It was released in October 1985 as the first single and title track from the album I Tell It Like It Used to Be.  The song reached number 7 on the Billboard Hot Country Singles & Tracks chart.

Chart performance

References

1986 singles
1985 songs
T. Graham Brown songs
Capitol Records Nashville singles
Songs written by Michael Garvin
Songs written by Bucky Jones
Songs written by Ron Hellard